Johnny Depp is an American actor, film producer and musician who works in Hollywood films. The following is a list of awards and nominations that Depp has received throughout his acting career. Among his numerous competitive awards, he has won the Screen Actors Guild Award for Outstanding Actor in a Leading Role for Pirates of the Caribbean: The Curse of the Black Pearl (2003), and the Golden Globe Award for Best Actor - Motion Picture Musical or Comedy for Sweeney Todd: The Demon Barber of Fleet Street. Additionally, he has been nominated three times for the Academy Award for Best Actor.

Major awards

Academy Awards

BAFTA Film Awards

Golden Globe Awards

Screen Actors Guild Awards

Other awards and nominations

Critics' Choice Movie Awards

Empire Awards

Golden Raspberry Awards

Hollywood Walk of Fame

Indiana Film Journalists Awards

IFTA Film & Drama Awards

Karlovy Vary International Film Festival

London Critics Circle Film Awards

MTV Movie Awards

National Movie Awards

Nickelodeon Kids' Choice Awards

Online Film Critics Society Awards

Palm Springs International Film Festival

People's Choice Awards

Phoenix Film Critics Society Awards

Rembrandt Awards

Russian Guild of Film Critics

San Sebastián International Film Festival

Santa Barbara International Film Festival

Satellite Awards

Saturn Awards

Teen Choice Awards

Washington D.C. Area Film Critics Association Awards

Orders, decorations, and medals

References

Depp, Johnny
Awards